The 62nd Tour of Flanders cycling classic was held on Sunday, 9 April 1978. The race was won by Belgian Walter Godefroot in a three-man sprint with Michel Pollentier and Gregor Braun. It was Godefroot's second win in the Tour of Flanders, after the 1968 event. 47 of 174 riders finished.

Route
The race started in Sint Niklaas and finished in Meerbeke (Ninove) – covering 260 km. There were eight categorized climbs:

Results

References

External links
 Video of the 1978 Tour of Flanders  on Sporza (in Dutch)

Tour of Flanders
Tour of Flanders
Tour of Flanders
Tour of Flanders
1978 Super Prestige Pernod